The Little Theatre in Rochester, New York, commonly known as "The Little" is a movie theatre located on historic East Avenue in downtown Rochester, New York and a modest non-profit multiplex specializing in art film, including independent and foreign productions outside the United States.

Founded in 1929, The Little is one of the oldest active movie theaters built specifically to show films in the US, serving as an alternative venue for cinema of higher artistic caliber than what was popular at the time. To remain in business, The Little has created a unique theater experience for its patrons strikingly different from that of standard commercial cinemas. The Little typically shows films that never make it to the large theater chains, either due to lack of publicity, popularity, exposure, or content that is too risky and/or inappropriate for larger audiences (such as NC-17 rated films).  Foreign films, independent films, some documentary films and art films are its common fare.

The Little is unique in the area in treating anime films as artistic cinema, and titles by the likes of Hayao Miyazaki always find their way to The Little's screens. Critics at The Little provide a synopsis of any film they intend to show, both on their website and posted around their ticket booths on the street.

The Little also offers live musical performances from local musicians, a rotating art gallery of local artists, and a cafe. Additionally, The Little serves as a performance venue during the Rochester International Jazz Festival each June. The Little is also the home of the Little Theatre Film Society, a group of theater aficionados in the Rochester area. The Little survives largely due to the hard work and dedication of the society's members. The theater is currently operated with the participation of the WXXI Public Broadcasting Council, a non-profit community organization which owns and operates the region's principal public radio and television stations.

The Little has become part of Rochester's extensive theater culture. Rochester has a rich history in cinema, being the home of the Eastman Kodak company and the George Eastman Museum. Kodak film was historically used in a majority of motion pictures (and still is today), creating close ties to the movie industry in Rochester society. The Little Theatre Film Society holds film festivals throughout the year, many of them hosted at The Little. The theatre is well known by any serious cinema patron in Rochester for providing an alternative to standard Hollywood commercial fare. The Little has also avoided the negative reputation for snobbishness that is sometimes associated with art house cinema, cultivating the image of a venue for anyone who is simply seeking an alternative or a community that celebrates cinema.

The word "Theatre" is often used instead of the word "Theater" to distinguish between art house cinemas and the more common variety. Theatre is an older form of the word, though both words share the same literal meaning. The Little uses the older form both to make this distinction and due to the age of the theater itself.

References

External links

Entry at Cinema Treasures
History of the Little Theatre
Yahoo's Independent Theater Directory has a listing of similar venues around the USA.

Art Deco architecture in Rochester, New York
Entertainment venues in Rochester, New York
Cinemas and movie theaters in New York (state)
Culture of Rochester, New York
Theatres on the National Register of Historic Places in New York (state)
National Register of Historic Places in Rochester, New York